Jeanne Hébuterne (6 April 1898 – 26 January 1920) was a French painter and art model best known as the frequent subject and common-law wife of the artist Amedeo Modigliani. She took her own life the day after Modigliani died, and is now buried beside him.

Early life 

Jeanne Hébuterne was born in Meaux, Seine-et-Marne, the second child to Achille Casimir Hébuterne (born 1857), who worked at Le Bon Marché, a department store, and Eudoxie Anaïs Tellier Hébuterne (born 1860). The family was Roman Catholic.

A beautiful girl, she was introduced to the artistic community in Montparnasse by her brother André Hébuterne, who wanted to become a painter. She met several of the then-starving artists and modeled for Tsuguharu Foujita.

Wanting to pursue a career in the arts, and with a talent for drawing, she chose to study at the Académie Colarossi, where in the spring of 1917 Hébuterne was introduced to Amedeo Modigliani by the sculptress Chana Orloff,  who came with many other artists to take advantage of the Academy's live models.

Jeanne began an affair with the charismatic artist, and the two fell deeply in love. She soon moved in with him, despite strong objection from her parents.

Life with Modigliani 

Described by the writer  (1883–1954) as gentle, shy, quiet, and delicate, Jeanne Hébuterne became a principal subject for Modigliani's art.

In the spring of 1918, the couple moved to the warmer climate of Nice on the French Riviera where Modigliani's agent hoped he might raise his profile by selling some of his works to the wealthy art connoisseurs who wintered there. While they were in Nice, their daughter, Jeanne Modigliani, was born on 29 November.

The following spring, they returned to Paris and Jeanne became pregnant again. By this time, Modigliani was suffering from tuberculous meningitis and his health, made worse by complications brought on by substance abuse, was deteriorating badly.

Death 

On 24 January 1920 Modigliani died. Hébuterne's family brought her to their home, but she threw herself out of the fifth-floor apartment window the day after Modigliani's death, killing herself and her unborn child.

Her family, who blamed her demise on Modigliani, interred her in the Cimetière de Bagneux. Nearly ten years later, at the request of Modigliani's brother, Emanuele, the Hébuterne family agreed to have her remains transferred to Père Lachaise Cemetery to rest beside Modigliani.

Her epitaph reads: "Devoted companion to the extreme sacrifice."

Legacy 

Their orphaned daughter, Jeanne Modigliani (1918–1984), was adopted by her father's sister in Florence, Italy. She grew up knowing virtually nothing of her parents and as an adult began researching their lives. In 1958, she wrote a biography of her father that was published in the English language in the United States as Modigliani: Man and Myth. 

It took more than thirty years before an art scholar persuaded the Hébuterne heirs to allow public access to Jeanne Hébuterne's artwork. In October 2000, her works were featured at a major Modigliani exhibition in Venice, Italy by the Fondazione Giorgio Cini.

It was revealed in January 2010 that the works presented at the exhibition were forged. Christian Parisot, the curator of the exhibition, had been accused by Hébuterne's grandnephew of faking 77 drawings. He was sentenced to a two-year suspended sentence and a 50,000€ ($70,000) fine by a French court of appeals.

Gallery

Works by Jeanne Hébuterne

Works by Modigliani featuring Hébuterne

References

External links 
 

1898 births
1920 deaths
1920 suicides
20th-century French women artists
Académie Colarossi alumni
Artists from Paris
Burials at Père Lachaise Cemetery
Female suicides
French artists' models
French Roman Catholics
French women painters
Modern painters
Painters who committed suicide
Suicides by jumping in France